William Andrew McDowell (10 January 1905 – 12 February 1964) was an Australian rules footballer who played with North Melbourne in the Victorian Football League (VFL).

Notes

External links 

1905 births
1964 deaths
Australian rules footballers from Victoria (Australia)
North Melbourne Football Club players
Australian rules footballers from Albury